Fabián de Luna (born 23 September 1996) is a Mexican artistic gymnast.

Born in Chicago to a Mexican father and an American mother, he represents Mexico at the international level.

In 2018, he won the gold medal in the rings event at the 2018 Pan American Gymnastics Championships held in Lima, Peru.

In 2019, he represented Mexico at the 2019 Pan American Games held in Lima, Peru and he won the gold medal in the men's rings event.

References

External links 
 

Living people
1996 births
Place of birth missing (living people)
Mexican male artistic gymnasts
Competitors at the 2019 Summer Universiade
Gymnasts at the 2019 Pan American Games
Medalists at the 2019 Pan American Games
Pan American Games gold medalists for Mexico
Pan American Games medalists in gymnastics
American sportspeople of Mexican descent
Sportspeople from Chicago
21st-century Mexican people